Distributed Free Rainbow Tables (or DistrRTgen) was a volunteer computing project for making rainbow tables for password cracking. By using the Berkeley Open Infrastructure for Network Computing (BOINC) software platform, DistrRTgen was able to generate rainbow tables that are able to crack long passwords. DistrRtgen was used to generate LM, NTLM, MD5 and MYSQLSHA1 rainbow tables.

All of the rainbow tables are downloadable at Free Rainbow Tables.

See also 
 RainbowCrack

References

 Science in society
Volunteer computing projects